Constitutional Assembly elections were held in Cuba on 15 November 1939. The result was a victory for the Opposition Front, which won 41 of the 76 seats.

Results

References

Cuba
Elections in Cuba
1939 in Cuba
November 1939 events
Election and referendum articles with incomplete results